The WaveBlaster is a  personal water craft (PWC) made by Yamaha Motor Corporation. Part of their WaveRunner line of watercraft, the Yamaha WaveBlaster 700 (Marine Jet 700TZ) made its debut in 1993. Although technically a runabout style PWC the blaster is more closely related to the SuperJet.

Yamaha's design philosophy for the Blaster was simplicity over comfort. Just handle bars with a trigger throttle and a motorcycle style seat made this a performance craft, that let riders enjoy sharply banked turns, tail stands and other acrobatic maneuvers. The performance character and lean in style turning is primarily due to the soft chines but are further enhanced by concave sections near the bow and Strakes along the hull. The claimed top speed was 44-45 mph. With its powerful engine, semi flat-bottomed hull, and chrome-alloy piston rings, this is a model that still has many devoted fans today. The drawbacks to the design is its high center of gravity making it difficult to ride at idle speeds, difficulty at boarding in deep water and somewhat athletic skills required.

Photos

Specifications
Rated power  @ 6,300 rpm
Net Weight: 
Length:
Beam: 
Engine Type 2-Cylinder, 2-Stroke 
Bore/Stroke 
Displacement 701 cc 
Fuel Regular Unleaded 
Type of Intake Reed Valve 
Type of Scavenging Loop-Charged 
Type of Exhaust Wet 
Mixing Ratio 50:1 (with oil injection pump) 
Cooling Water 
Starting Electric 
Ignition CDI 
Compression Ratio 7.2:1 
Carburetor/Injection (1) Mikuni Super BN 44 (1993–1995), (2) Mikuni Super BN 38 (1996) 
Spark Advance 6° 
Ignition Timing 15° BTDC – 21° BTDC 
Spark Plug BR8HS/B8HS 
Pump 144 mm Axial Flow Single Stage 
Transmission Direct Drive From Engine 
Impeller 3-Blade, Stainless Steel (14/18 pitch) 
Vehicle Capacity 1 Operator and 1 Passenger 
Hull Material FRP (fiberglass reinforced plastic)

History

Timeline
1987-1991
The precursor to these machines was the Yamaha WaveJammer, produced from 1987-1991. It was the world’s first sit-down type solo riding personal water craft. The combination of a fixed steering column and small hull made this a particularly agile model. It featured a 500cc twin cylinder engine, with a top speed around 25-30 mph on a smooth lake. The engine can be replaced with the newer 701cc engine, with minimal fitting problems.
 
1993 through 1994
The craft remained unchanged with the 61X cases and blue/purple color paint commonly referred to as "blurple".

1995
Yamaha changed the color to red.

1996
Yamaha added dual 38mm Mikuni carburetors and 62T cases to the WaveBlaster, resulting in slightly more power, from 63 to 73 hp.
This model was discontinued in 1996.

1997 through 1998
Yamaha changed the color scheme to blue and white and renamed the machine to WaveBlaster Limited (not available in USA).

1998
This model was discontinued in 1998.

Summary
This ski came from the factory as a stripped down no-frills machine —- it does not have a tachometer, speedometer, GPS, rear view mirrors, cup holder, ice box, luggage compartment or a reverse mechanism that are typical of larger multi-person skis. Yamaha also manufactured a WaveBlaster 2 and a WaveBlaster 3, the latter more commonly known as the WB800 in reference to its 800cc motor.

The WaveBlaster has been described by many as "the closest thing to riding a motorcycle on water".

References

See also
Pump-jet
Yamaha WaveRunner
Yamaha SuperJet

WaveBlaster
Personal water craft brands
Vehicles introduced in 1993